Rai or RAI may refer to:

Title of royalty and nobility
 Rai (title), meaning "king", equivalent to Rao or Roy, a princely title used by many Hindu rajput rulers in India
 Rai Bahadur, a noble title given during British Raj in India
 Rai Sahib, a noble title given during British Raj in India

People
 Rai (surname)
 Rai people, in Nepal and India
 Rai Sikh, adherents of Sikh faith

Given name
 Raí (born 1965), Brazilian footballer
 Raí (footballer, born 2002), full name Raí da Silva Pessanha, Brazilian footballer
 Lady Rai (–1530 BC), ancient Egyptian woman, nursemaid to Queen Ahmose-Nefertari
 Rai Benjamin (born 1997), American hurdler
 Rai Purdy (1910–1990), Canadian television director and producer
 Rai Simons (born 1996), Bermudian footballer
 Rai Thistlethwayte (born 1980), Australian musician
 Rai Vloet (born 1995), Dutch footballer

Places 
 Rai, Orne, France
 Rai, Sonipat, Haryana, India
 Rai, South Khorasan, Iran      
 Mount Rai Japan                
 Chiang Rai Province Thailand         
 Bo Rai District Thailand              
 Giá Rai  District in Vietnam
 RAI Amsterdam Convention Centre, Netherlands

Entertainment and media
 RAI, the national public broadcasting company of Italy
 Raï, folk music originating in Oran, Algeria and popular in France
 Rai (comics), fictional character in Valiant Comics
 Raï (1995 film), a 1995 French film directed by Thomas Gilou
 Rai (2016 film), Indian film about Muthappa Rai
 Al Rai (Kuwaiti newspaper), a daily newspaper
 Al Ra'i (Jordanian newspaper), a daily newspaper
 Alrai TV, a Kuwaiti television channel

Science, healthcare, and technology
 Radioactive iodine uptake test, a diagnostic scan
 Rai (unit), a traditional Thai unit of area
 Rencontre Assyriologique Internationale, annual conference of The International Association for Assyriology
 Root analogue dental implant
 Royal Anthropological Institute of Great Britain and Ireland

Transportation
 Amsterdam RAI station, a railway station in the Netherlands
 Islamic Republic of Iran Railways
 Praia International Airport in Cape Verde
 Rainham railway station in Kent (National Rail station code)
 Réseau Aérien Interinsulaire, now Air Tahiti

Other uses 
 Rai (East Syrian Ecclesiastical Province), a metropolitan province of the Church of the East
 Amsterdam RAI Exhibition and Convention Centre, an exhibition and convention Centre in Amsterdam
 Rai language (disambiguation), a group of Sino-Tibetan languages 
 Rai stones, a currency used in Yap, Caroline Islands
 Rai University, in Ahmedabad, Gujarat, India
 Retailers Association of India, an Indian trade association
 Reynolds American Inc., an American tobacco company
 Rai, a Thai poetic form used in laws and chronicles            
 Rai dynasty (–644 CE), a Buddhist dynasty based in Sindh in modern Pakistan
 List of storms named Rai, Tropical cyclones with this name

See also 
 Rai Cultura (disambiguation)
Rei (disambiguation)
Ray (disambiguation)
Rey (disambiguation)